James Paterson Fleming (7 January 1942 – 10 December 2020) was a Scottish professional footballer, who played for Partick Thistle, Luton Town, Dunfermline Athletic, Heart of Midlothian and Wigan Athletic. Jim left Wigan Athletic and moved into the Scottish Highland Football League with Ross County where Ian McNeil his former Manager at Wigan, was Manager.  Jim later in his footballing career became Player Coach with Inverness Clachnacuddin FC, another Highland Football League Club.

References

1942 births
2020 deaths
People from Alloa
Association football wingers
Scottish footballers
Sauchie F.C. players
Partick Thistle F.C. players
Luton Town F.C. players
Dunfermline Athletic F.C. players
Heart of Midlothian F.C. players
Wigan Athletic F.C. players
Scottish Football League players
English Football League players
Sportspeople from Clackmannanshire